Kelvin Manuel Mathijs Snoeks (born 12 September 1987 in Haarlem) is a Dutch racing driver. In 2010 he competed in the FIA Formula Two Championship. Snoeks stayed in Formula Two for the 2011 season. He is currently racing in the DTM Trophy, which is a support series for the DTM.

Racing record

Career summary

Complete FIA Formula Two Championship results
(key) (Races in bold indicate pole position) (Races in italics indicate fastest lap)

External links
  
 

1987 births
Living people
Sportspeople from Haarlem
Dutch racing drivers
Formula Renault 2.0 NEC drivers
Sweden Formula Renault 2.0 drivers
International Formula Master drivers
FIA Formula Two Championship drivers
Eurocup Mégane Trophy drivers
International GT Open drivers
ADAC GT Masters drivers
TDS Racing drivers
GT4 European Series drivers